Ulla Hahn is a German poet and novelist.

Partial bibliography

Poetry collections 
 Herz über Kopf (1981), 
 Spielende (1983), 
 Unerhörte Nähe (1988), 
 Freudenfeuer (1989), 
 Liebesgedichte (1993), 
 Epikurs Garten (1995), 
 Galileo und zwei Frauen (1997), 
 Bildlich gesprochen (1999), 
 Süßapfel rot (2003), 
 So offen die Welt (2004),

Novels 
 Ein Mann im Haus (1991), 
 Das verborgene Wort (2001), 
 Unscharfe Bilder (2003),

Awards 
 1986 Roswitha Prize
 2018 Hannelore Greve Literature Prize

References

External links 
 Ulla Hahn in: NRW Literatur im Netz 

Living people
German women novelists
German women poets
Year of birth missing (living people)